Joanna Clare Dawson Thomas (12 December 197626 April 2020) was a British professional female bodybuilder. She was the younger sister of British professional female bodybuilder Nicola Shaw. She was the youngest British female bodybuilder to win her IFBB pro card, at the age of 21.

Early life 
Thomas was born on 12 December 1976, in Truro, Cornwall, England, United Kingdom, the second of three children. Her father is a painter and decorator and her mother is a farm worker. She grew up in Camborne, Cornwall. At the age of 14, she was groomed by one of her parents' lodgers and he had a sexual relationship with her. 

She became interested in bodybuilding at age 14 when she saw a bodybuilding magazine that belonged to a college student who was staying with her family. While Thomas was a chronic asthmatic since childhood and was unable to do any sort of strenuous physical activities at a young age, she became inspired by the way women looked and knew she wanted to someday be like them. Thomas was very shy at a young age and did not pursue her desire to become a bodybuilder until she felt comfortable enough to do it. 

In 1993, she graduated from the Camborne Science and International Academy. Soon afterward she began training as a nurse.

Bodybuilding career

Amateur
At age 14, the  Thomas went to a nearby gym. The gym owner's wife dismissed her goal of building muscle by saying it should be left to the men, however, her husband began to train her. He gave her a training plan of a 3 splits routine a week while eating only 3 meals a day and no supplements. She soon discovered she had great genetics for bodybuilding and quickly grew out of her asthma. Thomas remarked, "Within six months of training I was the only girl in my gym class that could do proper push-ups". She began to seriously get into bodybuilding at the age of 15.

By the time Joanna Thomas turned 17 years old, bodybuilding had become a lifestyle for her as well as for her sister, Nicola Thomas, who like her also became inspired to become a bodybuilder. According to her mother, she started to go to a local gym when she was 17, but began "obsessive weight training". By this time she had decided that she was going to become a competitive bodybuilder and set her sights on becoming a professional in the field of bodybuilding. 

From the age of 17 to age 20 she began competing to become a professional to win the British Championships. In 1997, at age 20, she finished third in the championship finals. In that contest, her sister Nicola became the first lightweight to win the overall title and pro card (Nicola retired without competing as a professional). In 1998, she moved to Manchester, England to train at the gym Betta Bodies, and began taking anabolic steroids. She got help training from the gym owner, Kerry Kayes, along with Diane Royle. She was also sponsored by a supplement company, Chemical Nutrition. She won the British Championships in 1998, becoming the youngest woman in the world at that time to win an IFBB pro card.

Professional

1998-2003
At that point, Thomas felt that her physique needed substantial improvement before she could compete successfully as a professional, so she did not compete again until 2001. During this time Thomas finished two years of nurse training, but later left her schooling in order to focus on her bodybuilding career. During this time she moved to the United States to compete in the IFBB shows. She entered the 2001 Jan Tana Classic and won the lightweight class; there was no overall champion for Jan Tana that year which made her a co-champion with the other female bodybuilders who won their classes. This became her first victory as a professional. This also qualified her for her first Ms. Olympia in 2001. Before attending the Olympia, Steve Wennerstrom, a friend of hers, invited her to stay in his place in San Diego, California, to prepare for the Ms. Olympia competition. In 2001 Ms. Olympia, she would place 10th in the light-weight class.

2004-2007
 
Thomas then decided to take a break from competitive bodybuilding and focus on making improvements on her body in order to be more competitive. In 2004, after coming in 2nd place at the 2004 GNC Show of Strength lightweight division, she qualified again for the Ms. Olympia. At the 2004 Ms. Olympia, she placed 7th in the lightweight division of the event. During her time in California, she lived the high life, mixing with celebrities, driving fast cars, living in big houses, and going to lots of parties. She was injured in a car crash and started taking strong pain relief medication that was not available in the United Kingdom. After competing in the 2007 Atlantic City Pro, she retired from bodybuilding.

2007-2020
On 28 July 2010, Thomas announced in her blog that she was moving from UK back to Fort Lauderdale, Florida and coming out of retirement in bodybuilding. On 14 August 2010 she began training again after three years of retirement. After April 2011, Thomas had moved her home from Fort Lauderdale to Sarasota, Florida with her boyfriend, Miles, and was focusing on improving her physique in order to compete in the near future. She moved back to Cornwall, but suffered from anxiety and depression, along with physical pain due to the car accident. She began some modelling jobs and starred in adult movies but would then 'bulk out at competition time' by eating and drinking to excess as she gained weight. She began taking prescribed medication as well as illicit drugs, including heroin, to dull the pain she suffered in her neck, back and knees. She began to take heroin around 2016 or 2017.

Youngest British IFBB professional female bodybuilder
Thomas won the British Championships in 1998, becoming the youngest British woman in the world ever to win an IFBB pro card. In 2006, Michelle Jones won the middleweight and overall at the British Championships, breaking Thomas's record as she was eight months younger than she was when she won the British Championships in 1998. However, in 2005 the UKBFF had changed the rules of the British Championships so that while the men's winner would continue to get an automatic IFBB pro card, the women's winner would not. Thus Thomas retained her title as the youngest British IFBB professional female bodybuilder.

Competition history
1997 EFBB Northeast Qualifier - 1st (MW)
1997 EFBB British Championships - 3rd (LW)
1998 EFBB Northwest Qualifier - 1st (MW)
1998 EFBB British Championships - 1st (LW and Overall)
2001 IFBB Jan Tana Classic - 1st (LW)
2001 IFBB Ms. Olympia - 10th (LW)
2003 IFBB Jan Tana Classic - 2nd (LW)
2004 IFBB GNC Show of Strength - 2nd (LW)
2004 IFBB IFBB Ms. Olympia - 7th (LW)
2007 IFBB Atlantic City Pro - 4th (LW)

Statistics

Bodyweight and bodyfat

 2002 - Off Season: 
 2003 - In Season:  Off-Season: 
 2010 - In Season:  Off-Season:  Bodyfat: 3-6%
 2013 -

Measurements
Arms
 2001 - In Season:  Off-Season: 
 2002 - Off Season: 
 2003 -  - 
 2010 - 
 2013 - 

Calves
 2002 - Off Season: 
 2010 - 
 2013 - 

Chest 
 2002 - Off Season: 
 2003 -  - 
 2010 -  - 

Thighs
 2003 -  - 

Quads
 2010 - 
 2013 -

Death 
In April 2020 Thomas was found dead in her flat in Camborne, Cornwall by a police officer conducting a wellness check. A note was later found in her apartment by her mother which said if she was found dead "it would have been an accident". In November 2020, her GP surgery found that she had used steroids and anabolic steroids in her bodybuilding career, as well as illegal drugs and prescribed medication. Her cause of death was listed as multiple drug toxicity.

Her funeral was held in May 2020.

Personal life
Thomas married an American and they both moved to the United Kingdom in 2014, but he could not get a work permit and returned to the United States. Afterwards, they divorced and he later died. She was diagnosed with depression and bipolar disorder. She was a Christian.

Television

Supersize She

In 2005, Thomas was featured in a one-hour documentary on the British channel five called Supersize She, which also broadcast in the US on The Learning Channel. The show followed her training leading up to the 2004 Ms. Olympia contest. The documentary talks about her life, her parents' feelings about her decision to become a bodybuilder and nude model, her stringent dieting requirements and her passion for bodybuilding as well as all the sacrifices and physical changes she had to go through to become a professional bodybuilder. The documentary was a success in the UK and in the US where it had high ratings. This gave her a solid amount of exposure in her country and in the United States. In a short article in Robert Kennedy's MuscleMag International, She talked about finding a small level of fame after appearing in the documentary. She mentioned being recognized on the streets and being asked for autographs by people who saw the documentary.

Film appearance
In 2006, Thomas starred in the short comedy film, All's Swell That Ends Swell!, where she played the Beautician.

See also
 Female bodybuilding
 List of female professional bodybuilders

References

External links

1976 births
2020 deaths
Actresses from Manchester
British expatriates in the United States
English female bodybuilders
English people of Cornish descent
People from Camborne
People from Manchester
People from Palm Beach County, Florida
People from Sarasota, Florida
People from Truro
Professional bodybuilders
Sportspeople from Fort Lauderdale, Florida
Sportspeople from Hollywood, Florida
Sportspeople from Los Angeles
Sportspeople from Los Angeles County, California
Sportspeople from San Diego
Sportspeople from San Diego County, California
Sportspeople from Sarasota, Florida
Sportspeople from West Palm Beach, Florida